The Remains of the Day is a 1989 novel by the Nobel Prize-winning British author Kazuo Ishiguro. The protagonist, Stevens, is a butler with a long record of service at Darlington Hall, a stately home near Oxford, England. In 1956, he takes a road trip to visit a former colleague, and reminisces about events at Darlington Hall in the 1920s and 1930s.

The work received the Booker Prize for Fiction in 1989. A film adaptation of the novel, made in 1993 and starring Anthony Hopkins and Emma Thompson, was nominated for eight Academy Awards. In 2022, it was included on the "Big Jubilee Read" list of 70 books by Commonwealth authors, selected to celebrate the Platinum Jubilee of Elizabeth II.

Plot summary
The novel tells, in first-person narration, the story of Stevens, an English butler who has dedicated his life to the loyal service of Lord Darlington (who is recently deceased, and whom Stevens describes in increasing detail in flashbacks). As the work progresses, two central themes are revealed: Lord Darlington was a Nazi sympathizer; and Stevens is in love with Miss Kenton, the housekeeper at Darlington Hall, Lord Darlington's estate.

The novel begins in 1956, with Stevens receiving a letter from a former colleague, the housekeeper Miss Kenton, describing her married life, which Stevens believes hints at an unhappy marriage. Furthermore, Darlington Hall is short-staffed and could greatly use a skilled housekeeper like Miss Kenton. Stevens starts to consider paying Miss Kenton a visit. His new employer, a wealthy American named Mr. Farraday, encourages Stevens to borrow his car to take a well-earned vacation—a "motoring trip". Stevens accepts, and sets out for Cornwall, where Miss Kenton (now Mrs. Benn) lives.

During his journey, Stevens reflects on his unshakable loyalty to Lord Darlington, who had hosted lavish meetings between German sympathizers and English aristocrats in an effort to influence international affairs in the years leading up to the Second World War; on the meaning of the term "dignity" and what constitutes a great butler; and on his relationship with his late father, another "no-nonsense" man who dedicated his life to service. Ultimately, Stevens is forced to ponder Lord Darlington's character and reputation, as well as the true nature of his relationship with Miss Kenton. As the book progresses, evidence mounts of Miss Kenton's and Stevens' past mutual attraction and affection.

While they worked together during the 1930s, Stevens and Miss Kenton failed to admit their true feelings toward each other. Their conversations as recollected by Stevens show a professional friendship which at times came close to blossoming into romance, but this was evidently a line that neither dared cross. Stevens in particular never yielded, even when Miss Kenton tried to draw closer to him.

When they finally meet again, Mrs. Benn, having been married now for more than twenty years, admits to wondering if she made a mistake in marrying, but says she has come to love her husband and is looking forward to the birth of their first grandchild. Stevens later muses over lost opportunities, both with Miss Kenton and regarding his decades of selfless service to Lord Darlington, who may not have been worthy of his unquestioning fealty. Stevens even expresses some of these sentiments in casual conversation with a friendly stranger of a similar age and background whom he happens upon near the end of his travels. 

This man suggests that it is better to enjoy the present time in one's life than to dwell on the past, as "the evening" is, after all, the best part of the day. At the end of the novel, Stevens appears to have taken this to heart as he focuses on the titular "remains of the day", referring to his future service with Mr. Farraday and what is left of his own life.

Characters
Mr. Stevens, the narrator, an English butler who serves at Darlington Hall; a devoted man with high standards who is particularly concerned with dignity (exemplified by the fact that the reader never learns his first name)
Miss Kenton, the housekeeper at Darlington Hall, later married as Mrs Benn; an extremely capable and dignified servant who helps Mr Stevens manage Darlington Hall. As time passes, she and Mr Stevens develop a long-lasting bond
Lord Darlington, the owner of Darlington Hall.  A conference he holds between high-ranking diplomats is ultimately a failed effort toward appeasement talks between English and German powers; this causes his political and social decline
William Stevens (Mr. Stevens senior), the 72-year-old father of Mr Stevens, serving as under-butler; Stevens senior suffers a severe stroke during the conference at Darlington Hall.  His son was divided between serving and helping him
Senator Lewis, an American senator who criticises Lord Darlington as being an "amateur" in politics
Young Mr Cardinal, the son of one of Lord Darlington's closest friends and a journalist; he is killed in Belgium during the Second World War
M. Dupont, a high-ranking French politician who attends Lord Darlington's conference

On his motoring trip, Stevens briefly comes into contact with several other characters. They are mirrors to Stevens and show the reader different facets of his character; they are also all kind and try to help him. Two in particular, Dr. Carlisle and Harry Smith, highlight themes in the book.

Release and publication history 
Remains was first published in the United Kingdom by Faber and Faber in May 1989, and in the United States by Alfred A. Knopf on 4 October 1989.

Reception
The Remains of the Day is one of the most highly regarded post-war British novels. In 1989, the novel won the Booker Prize. It ranks 146th in a composite list, compiled by Brian Kunde of Stanford University, of the best 20th-century English-language fiction.

In 2006, The Observer asked 150 literary writers and critics to vote for the best British, Irish or Commonwealth novel from 1980 to 2005; The Remains of the Day placed joint-eighth. In 2007, The Remains of the Day was included in a Guardian list of "Books you can't live without" and also in a 2009 "1000 novels everyone must read" list. The Economist has described the novel as Ishiguro's "most famous book".

On 5 November 2019, the BBC News listed The Remains of the Day on its list of the 100 most influential novels.

In a retrospective review published in The Guardian in 2012, Salman Rushdie argues that "the real story … is that of a man destroyed by the ideas upon which he has built his life". In Rushdie's view, Stevens's obsession with dignified restraint has cost him loving relationships with his father and with Miss Kenton.

Kathleen Wall argues that Remains "may be seen to be about Stevens's attempts to grapple with his unreliable memories and interpretations and the havoc that his dishonesty has played on his life" (emphasis in original). In particular, she suggests that Remains challenges scholarly accounts of the unreliable narrator. Wall notes that the ironic effect of Mr Stevens's narration depends on the reader's assuming that he describes events reliably, while interpreting those events in self-serving or peculiar ways.

According to Steven Connor, Remains thematises the idea of English national identity. In Mr Stevens's view, the qualities of the best butlers, which involve restraining personal emotions in favour of keeping up appearances, are "identified as essentially English". Connor argues that early critics of Remains, who saw it as a novel about Japanese national identity, were mistaken: "there seems to be no doubt that it is Englishness that is at stake or under analysis in this novel".

Adaptations
The novel was adapted into a film of the same name in 1993. Directed by James Ivory and produced by Ismail Merchant, Mike Nichols and John Calley (i.e., Merchant Ivory Productions), the film starred Anthony Hopkins as Stevens, Emma Thompson as Miss Kenton. The supporting cast included Christopher Reeve as Congressman Lewis, James Fox as Lord Darlington, Hugh Grant as Reginald Cardinal and Peter Vaughan as Mr Stevens, Sr. The film adaptation was nominated for eight Academy Awards. In the film, the man who has bought Darlington Hall is the by then retired from politics Congressman Lewis.
A radio play adaptation in two-hour-long episodes starring Ian McDiarmid was first broadcast on BBC Radio 4 on 8 and 15 August 2003.
A musical adaptation of the novel by Alex Loveless was staged in 2010 in London's Union Theatre, and received positive reviews.

References

Sources

Further reading
 
 
 

Novels by Kazuo Ishiguro
Booker Prize-winning works
1989 British novels
British novels adapted into films
Fiction with unreliable narrators
Historical novels
Fiction set in 1956
Novels set in Wiltshire
Faber and Faber books
Postmodern novels
First-person narrative novels
Works set in country houses